De Stolpen (sometimes just "Stolpen") is a hamlet in the Dutch province of North Holland. It is part of the municipality of Schagen, and is located about 3 km northwest of the village of Schagerbrug.

In 2005, the municipal council of the former municipality of Zijpe decided that the N9 road had to be moved; as a consequence, all of the houses in De Stolpen would have to be demolished. The national government changed this decision in December 2006, which saved the hamlet. This saved what is essentially a row of a few contiguous homes on the north side of the road.

References

Schagen
Populated places in North Holland